Fried Barry is a 2020 South African black comedy science fiction horror film written and directed by Ryan Kruger. The film has its world premiere at the 2020 Cinequest Film Festival. The film stars Gary Green, Bianka Hartenstein, Sean Cameron Michael, Chanelle de Jager, Joey Cramer, and Jonathan Pienaar. The story follows a drug addict whose body is taken over by an alien, who goes on a joyride through Cape Town, South Africa.

Cast
 Gary Green
 Bianka Hartenstein
 Sean Cameron Michael
 Chanelle de Jager
 Joey Cramer
 Jonathan Pienaar
 Kevin Mohoni
Tuks Tad Lungu

Release
The film has its world premiere at the 2020 Cinequest Film Festival and also screened at Sitges Film Festival, Fantasia Film Festival, Grimmfest and Fantasporto. It has also screened at South Africa's RapidLion Film Festival winning three awards.

In March 2021, it was announced that Shudder acquired the distribution rights of the film for release in North America, the United Kingdom, the Republic of Ireland, Australia and New Zealand on 6 May of that year.

Awards and nominations

References

External links
 

2020 films
2020 horror thriller films
South African horror thriller films
2020s English-language films
English-language South African films